Gonapola  is a village in Sri Lanka. It is located within Western Province.

See also
List of towns in Western Province, Sri Lanka

External links

Populated places in Western Province, Sri Lanka